The Chama River may refer to:

 Chama River (Venezuela), the main river of the state of Mérida in Venezuela
 Rio Chama, United States, a tributary of the Rio Grande